"Jerk" is a song by American singer Oliver Tree, originally released on July 17, 2020, as part of his debut studio album Ugly Is Beautiful. Upon release, the song largely stood out to music critics reviewing the album. Noted for its "groan haunts", Pitchfork writer Cat Zhang drew comparisons to Billie Joe Armstrong, while NME Ben Jolly described the song as "an anti-bullying anthem-in-waiting". Tree sings about his experiences of being an outcast and eventually realizes that his hatred for jerks is "a double-edged sword".

Southstar remix
German DJ and producer Southstar released a remix of the song on May 9, 2022, titled "Miss You". Due to response of the use of Tree's vocals, it was later re-released as a single on July 30, 2022 through B1. A "sped-up version" of the song was released on October 12, 2022. It debuted at number 88 in Germany and went on to reach the top 10 by October, as well as the top 40 in Austria, Ireland, Lithuania and Switzerland.

Charts

Weekly charts

Year-end charts

Certifications

Robin Schulz and Oliver Tree remix

Another remix of the song was released on August 5, 2022, by German DJ Robin Schulz and credited to both Schulz and Oliver Tree. The release instantly sparked controversy after Schulz had been accused of releasing an almost identical song with only a few alterations. In response to the issue, the original remix by Southstar reached commercial success in Germany, while Schulz's version failed to make an impact initially. Several artists, including Bausa, Prinz Pi and Yung Hurn, spoke out against Schulz, urging fans to stream the original by Southstar instead. In response to the backlash, Schulz's manager Stefan Dabruck issued a statement saying that the confusion around "Miss You" was "intentional" and that Schulz was hoping for a remix with Southstar prior to the release.

Charts

Weekly charts

Year-end charts

Certifications

Other remixes
Due to rising popularity of the song, a sped up version was released on December 14, 2022.

References

2020 songs
2022 singles
Oliver Tree songs
Robin Schulz songs
Atlantic Records singles
Columbia Records singles
Songs involved in plagiarism controversies